Route 165 and County Road 165 (CR 165) form a loop around the west side of Branson, Missouri, in Taney and Stone counties. The highway's southern terminus is at US 65 south of Branson, in Hollister. Even though the county road designation belongs to Taney County, it briefly enters Stone County at Table Rock State Park. Upon re-entering Taney County, it crosses the Table Rock Lake Dam, along with Route 265, at Table Rock Lake. Its northern terminus is at US 65 along the Red Route in north Branson.


Route description

CR 165 begins at, and running concurrently with, US 65 Business at an interchange with US 65, where the road meets Industrial Park Drive in Hollister. The road begins its loop around Branson's west side in a clockwise direction. Near the entrance to College of the Ozarks at Opportunity Lane, US 65 Bus. turns right, while CR 165 heads left. The road eventually leaves Hollister and crosses Short Creek in rural Taney County. It then joins Route 265 in a concurrency, at which point Missouri Route 165 begins. In Table Rock State Park, the three highways briefly enter Stone County, where the road encounters the junction with the Showboat Branson Belle. After re-entering Taney County, the road crosses the Table Rock Dam on the White River, and enters the Table Rock neighborhood of Branson. There, Route 265 splits from the concurrency, turning left while Route 165 and CR 165 head right. When Route 165/CR 165 arrive at the intersection with Seventy-six Country Boulevard in Branson, Route 165 ends and CR 165 continues north along the Blue Route (Gretna Road). The Blue Route leaves this concurrency by turning right on Roark Valley Road, while Gretna Road continues north with CR 165. When the road meets the Route 248/Red Route concurrency on Shepherd of the Hills Expressway, CR 165 heads east along with Route 248 and the Red Route until they meet the interchange with US 65. There, CR 165 and Route 248 terminate, as the Red Route continues into Downtown Branson.

History
The portion of CR 165 that runs between the southern terminus of Route 165 and Freeman Lane (former US 65/US 160) was once part of Route 165. This stretch of CR 165, along with the portion between Freeman Ln. and Opportunity Drive, is designated Historic Highway 165 on street signs. The stretch of CR 165 between Opportunity Dr. and US 65 in Hollister was once signed as Route V.

Junction list

References

165
Transportation in Stone County, Missouri
Transportation in Taney County, Missouri